Jonathan C. Jordan (born May 26, 1968) is a North Carolina politician and attorney who served as the legislator for the 93rd district of the North Carolina House of Representatives from 2011 to 2019. During his first term, Jordan served as the Deputy Majority Whip of the North Carolina House of Representatives. He was elected to office in the 2010 election defeating Cullie Tarleton by fewer than 800 votes.  He defeated Tarleton again in 2012 and was reelected in 2014 and 2016, before losing in the 2018 midterm election to Watauga County Democrat Ray Russell, a professor who won with the help of students on the campus of Appalachian State University. Jordan resides in Ashe County, North Carolina and has two children in the public schools. He is an attorney by profession.

Before his election in 2010 Jordan served as the Communications Director for the North Carolina Republican Party and as the County Attorney for Stokes County, North Carolina. He graduated from the University of North Carolina at Chapel Hill in 1996 with a JD/MPA (Juris Doctor/Master of Public Administration), from Vanderbilt University's Owen Graduate School of Management with an MBA, and Wake Forest University with a BA in Economics and Politics. He has served on the Boards of Directors of the Ashe County Chamber of Commerce, the Ashe County Home Builders Association, the Ashe County Pregnancy Care Center, as well as the Legal Aid of North Carolina Board.

Endorsements
In 2018, Jordan was listed as a Champion of the Family in the NC Values Coalition Scorecard. In 2016, Jordan was endorsed by the State Employee's Employees Political Action Committee (EMPAC) on their legislative endorsement page .

Background
Prior to running for office, Jordan worked for the John Locke Foundation, a state-based think tank.

North Carolina House of Representatives

Education funding

The 2018 budget Jordan voted for raised teacher pay for the fifth time in 5 years. Jordan voted for the 2017 budget that added $45 million to the Opportunity Scholarship Program, a program that provides educational improvements to low-income students and their families who are not served well by the public schools. He voted for the 2015 budget that provided teachers and all state employees with a one-time bonus of $750. In 2015, NC teacher pay was ranked in the bottom 10 in the nation. He also voted for the 2013 budget, which did not raise teacher pay, cut education spending, and increased class sizes. This bill also included the Opportunity Scholarship Act, which provided money to those students and families whose needs did not fit into the one-size-fits-all government school system.

Medicaid expansion

Jordan voted against expanding Medicaid in 2013. A study found that opting out of the Medicaid expansion would cost 455 to 1,145 lives per year.

Environment

Jordan voted against a bill that passed the cost of Duke Energy's coal ash spill to its ratepayers. He voted for another bill that allowed Duke Energy to avoid coal ash cleanup. Jordan voted against an amendment that would have protected ratepayers from paying to cleanup the coal ash. Frank Holleman, a senior attorney at the left-wing Southern Environmental Law Center said "this coal ash bill is damning proof that the families and communities of North Carolina can't rely on state politicians to protect their drinking water supplies from Duke Energy's coal ash pollution..."

Electoral history

2018

2016

2014

2012

2010

References

External links

 NC General Assembly Profile
 Project Vote Smart Biography

Living people
People from Ashe County, North Carolina
Republican Party members of the North Carolina House of Representatives
University of North Carolina School of Law alumni
1968 births
21st-century American politicians
UNC School of Government alumni